The Ponzo illusion is a geometrical-optical illusion that was first demonstrated by the Italian psychologist Mario Ponzo (1882–1960) in 1911. He suggested that the human mind judges an object's size based on its background. He showed this by drawing two identical lines across a pair of converging lines, similar to railway tracks. The upper line looks longer because we interpret the converging sides according to linear perspective as parallel lines receding into the distance. In this context, we interpret the upper line as though it were farther away, so we see it as longer – a farther object would have to be longer than a nearer one for both to produce retinal images of the same size.

One of the explanations for the Ponzo illusion is the "perspective hypothesis", which states that the perspective feature in the figure is obviously produced by the converging lines ordinarily associated with distance, that is, the two oblique lines appear to converge toward the horizon or a vanishing point. Another is the "framing-effects hypothesis", which says that the difference in the separation or gap of the horizontal lines from the framing converging lines may determine, or at least contribute to the magnitude of the distortion.

The Ponzo illusion is one possible explanation of the Moon illusion, with objects appearing "far away" (because they are "on" the horizon) appearing bigger than objects "overhead". However, some have argued that explaining one perception ("appears far away") in terms of another ("appears bigger") is problematic scientifically, and that there are probably complex internal processes behind these illusions.

The Ponzo illusion also occurs in touch and with an auditory-to-visual sensory-substitution device. However, prior visual experience seems mandatory to perceive it as demonstrated by the fact that congenitally blind subjects are not sensitive to it.

The Ponzo illusion has also been used to demonstrate a dissociation between vision-for-perception and vision-for-action (see Two-streams hypothesis). Thus, the scaling of grasping movements directed towards objects embedded within a Ponzo illusion is not subject to the size illusion. In other words, the opening between the index finger and thumb is scaled to the real not the apparent size of the target object as the grasping hand approaches the object.

Cross-cultural differences in susceptibility to the Ponzo illusion have been noted, with non-Western and rural people showing less susceptibility. Other recent research suggests that an individual's receptivity to this illusion, as well as the Ebbinghaus illusion, may be inversely correlated with the size of that individual's primary visual cortex.

References

Further reading

External links
An interactive illustration of the Ponzo illusion in Roger Shepard's Terror Subterra

Optical illusions